Sarat Chandra Pandit (27 April 1879 – 27 April 1968), better known as ‘Dada Thakur’ (দাদাঠাকুর), was a well-known composer of humorous rhymes, writer, publisher and social critic. He had his ancestral house at Dafarpur in West Bengal, India. However, the ancestral seat of the Pandits were originally at Dharmapur, a village in Rampurhat subdivision, Birbhum District of West Bengal. Sarat Chandra Pandit's grandfather Ishan Chandra Pandit left his ancestral village Dharmapur and settled in Dafarpur following a family conflict.Sarat Chandra Pandit single-handedly published the newspaper 'Jungipore Sangbad', from Jangipur playing the roles of author, press-compositor, proof-reader and printer. Initially he was assisted by his wife and temporary workers in running the press, a wooden hand-press which was run in his bedroom. He also published 'Bidushak' [বিদূষক] (Jester), a pamphlet of satire, humor and social commentary and used it as his weapon for social change and to bring public awareness against corruption.

Career
He was known for his ability to memorise, ability to compose at will rhymes and songs full of puns and wit. Sarat Chandra Chatterjee gave him the name 'Bidushak Sarat Chandra' in recognition of his very popular humorous compositions. His keen knowledge of both the Bengali, Hindi and English languages made him a unique composer of multilingual rhymes and witticisms. He created much Bengali Palindrome. The local British administrators also became aware of him and his criticism.

Popular culture
The Bengali film Dada Thakur'' (1962) was made in his lifetime commemorating his life, with Chhabi Biswas playing the titular role of Dadathakur. This film Dadathakur was also awarded president award in the year 1962.

References

External links 
 A collection of songs composed by Dadathakur

1879 births
1968 deaths
People from Murshidabad district
Indian male writers
Indian Hindus
Indian satirists
Journalists from West Bengal
20th-century Indian journalists
Writers in British India